Leptoglanis xenognathus is a species of loach catfish found in the Congo River Basin in the countries of  the Central African Republic and the Democratic Republic of Congo.  This fish grows to about 7.8 centimetres (3.1 in) TL.

References

Amphiliidae
Fish of Africa
Taxa named by George Albert Boulenger
Fish described in 1902